is a Japanese politician of the New Komeito Party, a member of the House of Councillors in the Diet (national legislature). A native of Suginami, Tokyo and high school graduate, she was elected for the first time in 2004.

References

External links 
 Official website in Japanese.

Members of the House of Councillors (Japan)
Living people
1963 births
People from Suginami
New Komeito politicians